Christos Palates (born July 13, 1990) is a Cypriot footballer who plays for the Cypriot side Akritas Chloraka in the Cypriot Third Division.
In September 2008, he joined APOP Kinyras Peyias with which on May 17, 2009, he won the Cypriot Cup 2008-09.

Honours
Cypriot Cup:
Winners (1): 2009

External links
Profile at cfa.com.cy

1990 births
Living people
Cypriot footballers
APOP Kinyras FC players
Cypriot First Division players
Association football midfielders